Yu Todoroki (轟 悠 Todoroki Yū) is a current member of Takarazuka Revue, where she plays an otokoyaku. She joined the Revue in 1985, became the top star of Snow Troupe in 1997, transferred to Superior Members in 2002 (upon the resignation of her top star partner Hitomi Tsukikage) and became the youngest member to serve on the company's board of directors in 2003. Todoroki stepped down from her position as member of the board of directors on July 18th 2020 and functions now as a special advisor.  She is from Hitoyoshi, Kumamoto Prefecture and her birthday is August 11.

Todoroki usually plays morally grey, charismatic men, who often have a historic background or are actual historical figures. Notable roles include: Luigi Lucheni (Elisabeth), Ravic (Arch of Triumph), Rhett Butler (Gone with the Wind), Abraham Lincoln (For The People) and Ernesto "Che" Guevara (Che Guevara). 

Her nicknames are Tom and Ishi-san.

Troupe history

Moon Troupe: 1985–1988
Snow Troupe: 1988–2002
Superior Member: 2002–present

General information

Currently referred to as "Top of the Tops" in the Revue, she is considered to be one of the greatest Takarazuka actresses in this generation and has many fans. When Hitomi Tsukikage, her second top star partner in Snow Troupe, resigned from the company, she considered resigning as well since she had reached the height of her career in the company. However, Yachiyo Kasugano, Todoroki's teacher (member of the theater since 1929; with the company until her death in 2012), persuaded her to stay and she became the second top star in the company's history to resign from top star status but remain in the company (Yuri Haruna is the first case). In 2003, also upon the invitation of Yachiyo Kasugano, she became a member of the directors of the company, the youngest ever to serve the board of directors in the company's history.

Todoroki Yu's ability to portray men in a realistic fashion, as opposed to the "ideal man" approach otokoyaku usually take, has been the key to her success. This manliness is also the reason, why even off-stage Todoroki's gender has caused some confusion. Michael Kunze and his wife, the dog of a fellow actress, as well as some French men reportedly perceived Todoroki Yu as male.

Debuting in Moon Troupe in 1985, her career began blossoming when she was transferred to Snow Troupe in 1988. Like her juniors who went on to become top stars, such as Yōka Wao and Jun Sena, she was a solid "second man" to Fubuki Takane, her top star superior. Upon the resignation of Takane, she rose to the top of her career on the Takarazuka stage. Currently as a member of Senka (Superior Members), she sometimes makes special appearances in the Grand Theater performances of other troupes. She also stars in smaller-theater productions with other troupes.

She was the third top star to be partnered with legendary top musumeyaku Mari Hanafusa, but their time together was short due to the formation of the Cosmos Troupe in 1998, when both Hanafusa and Todoroki's "second man" Yōka Wao were transferred to the new troupe.

After a year without any performances at the Grand Theater, she joined Cosmos Troupe (Top Stars: Yūga Yamato and Hana Hizuki) for the musical Dawn Wind, based on the life of Jiro Shirasu, started in February 2008. This was the first time she had appeared in a Cosmos production since the troupe's establishment in 1998 and made her one of the few actresses who has participated the productions of all five troupes within the company.

Over the years Todoroki Yu's acting on stage has received quite a lot of praise and earned her a series of awards. Furthermore, the Cuban embassy commended her portrayal of Ernesto Guevara in the musical Che Guevara. 

She enjoys painting and has held exhibitions for her works 6 times.

Todoroki Yu has held two concerts so far. Stylish! (Aoyama Theater) in 2002 and Lavender Monologue (Takarazuka Bow Hall, Nippon Seinenkan Hall) in 2007.

Todoroki was a special supporter of the 2019 World Women's Handball Championship and sang Japan's national anthem at the opening ceremony.

Notable performances and roles

Moon new actor era
Me and My Girl (1987-88) - Gerald Bolingbroke

Snow new actor era
Rose of Versailles (1989) - Andre
The Great Gatsby (1991-92) - Biloxi, Jay Gatsby (shinjinkoen performance)
Myth of Lovers (1992) - (First leading performance at Takarazuka Bow Hall)

Snow era
Gone with the Wind (1994) - Rhett Butler (Takarazuka Cast); Rhett Butler and Ashley Wilkes (Tokyo Cast)
Akanesasu Murasaki no Hana (1995, 1996) - Prince Naka no Ōe
JFK (1995) - Dr. Martin Luther King Jr.
Elisabeth (1996) - Luigi Lucheni
Natasha of the Rainbow (1996, 1997) - Takeshi Kurisaki
Kamen no Romanesque (1997) - Chevelier de Danceney

Snow top star era
Ghost at Midnight (Top Star Debut, 1997) - Charles
Shun'ou Fu (1997-1998) - Jana Ryuuzan
THE FICTION (1998) - One-Man Show based on the life of Giacomo Casanova
Gone with the Wind (1998) - Rhett Butler
The Man Called Bacchus (1999, 2000) - Julian Grandgeorges
Arch of Triumph (2000) - Ravic
In Search of El Dorado (2001) - Yataro Iwasaki
Flaming Love - Fuchai, King of Wu (final performance as the top star of Snow Troupe, 2001-02)

Senka era

With Flower Troupe
Gone with the Wind (Nissay Theater, 2002) - Rhett Butler
A Flute Named Wind (2003) - Matsudaira Tadateru Kazusanosuke (first Takarazuka Grand Theater performance as a Senka member)
The Odd Couple (2012) - Oscar Madison
For The People (2016) - Abraham Lincoln

With Moon Troupe
Rome at Dawn (Takarazuka Grand Theater, 2006) - Julius Caesar
Oklahoma! (Nissay Theater, 2006) - Curly McLain
Gone with the Wind (2014, 2015) - Rhett Butler
Oedipus Rex (2015) - Oedipus
Shigure Hill Road in Nagasaki (2017) - Isaji
Che Guevara (2019) - Ernesto "Che" Guevara

With Snow Troupe
Gone with the Wind (Nissay Theater, 2002) - Rhett Butler
Hanakuyou - Commemoration of the Buddha's Birthday (Nissay Theater, 2004) - Emperor Go-Mizunoo
Evgeni Onegin (2010) - Evgeni Onegin
Arch of Triumph (Takarazuka Grand Theater, 2018) - Ravic

With Star Troupe
Shigure Hill Road in Nagasaki (Takarazuka Grand Theater, 2005) - Isaji
Kean (Nissay Theater, 2007) - Edmund Kean
The Odd Couple (2011) - Oscar Madison
Chapter Two (2013-14) - George Schneider
South Pacific (2013) - Emile de Becque
The Lost Glory (Grand Theater, 2014) - Otto Goldstein
Doctor Zhivago (2018) - Yuri Zhivago
Cyrano de Bergerac (2020) - Cyrano de Bergerac

With Cosmos Troupe
A Morning Breeze: The Challenge of Jiro Shirasu, the Samurai Gentleman (Takarazuka Grand Theater, 2008) - Jiro Shirasu
The Eagle with Two Heads (2016) - Stanislas

Dinner Shows and Concerts
L'hortensia de Juin (Dinner Show, 1997)
Les Jours d'Amour (Dinner Show, 1999)
Stylish! (Concert, 2002)
Alpha - 20ans FACE OF YU (20th Anniversary Dinner Show, 2005)
Lavender Monologue (Concert, 2007)
Eternal Way With Yu (30th Anniversary Dinner Show, 2015)
Yu 35, A New World (35th Anniversary Dinner Show, 2019)
(Since 1997 Todoroki Yu has the tradition to hold a dinner show every year.)

Awards
2000 - 55th ACA National Arts Festival, award of excellence (theater): Ravic (Arch of Triumph)
2002 - 28th Kikuta Kazuo Theater Awards: Rhett Butler (Gone with the Wind)
2002 - 12th Japanese Movie Critics Awards, (musical): Rhett Butler (Gone with the Wind)
2017 - 24th Yomiuri Theater Awards, award of excellence (actress): Abraham Lincoln (For the People)

References

Japanese actresses
Takarazuka Revue
Living people
People from Kumamoto Prefecture
People from Hitoyoshi, Kumamoto
Takarazuka otokoyaku
Year of birth missing (living people)